Luke O'Connor (born 2000) is an Irish hurler who plays for Offaly Championship club St. Rynagh's and at inter-county level with the Offaly senior hurling team. He usually lines out as a forward.

Career

O'Connor first came to prominence as a hurler at club level with St. Rynagh's. After beginning at juvenile and underage levels, he eventually progressed to senior level and was part of the St. Rynagh's team that won three consecutive County Championship titles between 2019 and 2021. O'Connor first appeared on the inter-county scene as a member of the Offaly minor hurling team before progressing onto the under-20 team. As a member of the Offaly senior hurling team since 2021 he has enjoyed National League and Christy Ring Cup successes.

Career statistics

Honours

St. Rynagh's
Offaly Senior Hurling Championship: 2019, 2020, 2021

Offaly
Christy Ring Cup: 2021
National Hurling League Division 2A: 2021

References

2000 births
Living people
St Rynagh's hurlers
Offaly inter-county hurlers